Sharlene Royer is a Canadian actress and stunt performer.

Early life
Royer was born in Saint-Hyacinthe, Quebec, Canada.

Career
Royer began her career as a child actor, at age 9 an agent came to her dance class looking for children interested in performing in a commercial. Her stunt career began in 1999 when the stunt coordinator on The Adventures of Pluto Nash needed a stunt double for Rosario Dawson, he recruited Royer offering to train her in stunt work.  She has been a stunt performer on films such as Warcraft: The Beginning, X-Men: Days of Future Past, Star Trek Beyond and the television series Legends of Tomorrow. Royer has also done motion capture work for video games, most notably on the Assassin’s Creed series and the Far Cry series.

In 2015 Royer, and her follow stunt performers, were nominated for the SAG Award Outstanding Action Performance by a Stunt Ensemble in a Motion Picture, for their work on X-Men: Days of Future Past.

References

External links
 

Canadian television actresses
Living people
Actresses from Quebec
People from Saint-Hyacinthe
Year of birth missing (living people)